The 3rd Wyoming Territorial Legislature was a former meeting of the Wyoming Legislature that lasted from November 4, to December 12, 1873.

History

Formation

On November 4, 1873, Joseph W. Fisher, Chief Justice of the Wyoming Supreme Court, swore in the members of the state legislature.

During the election of the Speaker of the House of Representatives, S. H. Wilkinson was nominated by H. Conley and N. L. Andrews was nominated by William H. Holliday. Ten members of the House voted for Wilkinson, two voted for N. L. Andrews, and one voted for C. A. Phippes. Secretary of the Territory Jason B. Brown ruled that Wilkinson won and Fisher inaugurated him as Speaker.

Francis E. Warren was selected to serve as the President of the Council.

Membership

Council

House of Representatives

Members of the Wyoming House of Representatives

References

Wyoming legislative sessions